"Look Through Any Window" is a song by the British beat group the Hollies. It was their follow-up single to their first UK chart-topper, "I'm Alive", and reached No.4 in the UK Singles Chart at the beginning of October 1965.

"Look Through Any Window" was The Hollies' first American Billboard Top 40 hit, peaking at No.32 on 22 January 1966 ("Just One Look" in 1964 had been the band's first American chart hit). It made No.3 in Canada in the RPM Magazine charts, as well as in South Africa. Written by songwriters Graham Gouldman and Charles Silverman, it features a distinctive 12-string guitar riff, soaring harmonies and Bobby Elliott’s explosive drumming. They also recorded a version in French (titled "Regardez par des fenêtres") that was not officially released at the time but was included on the 1988 compilation Rarities.

Cash Box described it as a "medium-paced laconic teen-slanted ditty with a contagious repeating rhythmic riff." 

First released as a single in the UK, it was included in the US version of the band's 1965 album Hollies titled Hear! Here! by their US label, Imperial Records.

The B-side, "So Lonely", later included on Hollies and Hear! Here!, was also recorded by the Everly Brothers and released in July 1966 on their Two Yanks in England album.

Cover versions 
 The American group Gary Lewis & the Playboys recorded the song for their 1966 album Hits Again!.
 The Yugoslav rock band Elipse recorded a Serbo-Croatian version entitled "Pogledaj kroz prozor" in 1966.
 The Brazilian band Renato e Seus Blue Caps recorded a version entitled “Pra Você Não Sou Ninguém”, in 1966, for their album Um Embalo Com Renato e Seus Blue Caps, singing in Portuguese.

References

1965 singles
The Hollies songs
Parlophone singles
Songs written by Graham Gouldman
1965 songs
Imperial Records singles
Jangle pop songs